Daniel D. McCracken (July 23, 1930 – July 30, 2011) was a computer scientist in the United States. He was a professor of Computer Sciences at the City College of New York, and the author of over two dozen textbooks on computer programming, with an emphasis on guides to programming in widely used languages such as Fortran and COBOL.  His A Guide to Fortran Programming (Wiley, 1961) and its successors were the standard textbooks on that language for over two decades.  His books have been translated into fourteen languages.

Career
McCracken was born in 1930 in Hughesville, Judith Basin County, Montana, a mining town, and graduated in 1951 from Central Washington University with degrees in mathematics and chemistry.  He worked seven years with the General Electric Company in computer applications and programmer training. After that, he worked at the New York University Atomic Energy Commission Computer Center, and was a graduate student at the Courant Institute of Mathematical Sciences. In 1959 he became a consultant and continued writing on computer subjects. In 1970 he earned a Master of Divinity degree from the Union Theological Seminary in New York.

From 1976 to 1978, he was vice president of the Association for Computing Machinery (ACM), from 1978 to 1980 he was president of the ACM, and in 1994 he was inducted as an ACM Fellow. He served as ACM's representative to the Board of Directors of the Institute for Certification of Computing Professionals (ICCP) and was inducted to its hall of fame as an ICCP Fellow in 1998.

He joined the City College of New York Computer Sciences Department in 1981. In 1989 he received the Norbert Wiener Award for Social and Professional Responsibility from Computer Professionals for Social Responsibility.

Death
McCracken died of cancer a week after his 81st birthday on July 30, 2011, in New York City. He was survived by his second wife, Helen Blumenthal, seven children, nine grandchildren, and two great-grandchildren. He was preceded in death by his first wife, Evelyn Edwards, three brothers and two sisters.

Books

References

External links
 "Daniel McCracken, Interview by Arthur L. Norberg, January 7-9, 2008", Association for Computing Machinery historical interview.
 Dan McCracken's webpage at City College of New York
 Daniel D. McCracken Papers, 1958-1983. Charles Babbage Institute, University of Minnesota, Minneapolis.
 "Obituary: Daniel D. McCracken", The New York Times, August 1, 2011
 

1930 births
2011 deaths
People from Judith Basin County, Montana
Central Washington University alumni
Courant Institute of Mathematical Sciences alumni
Union Theological Seminary (New York City) alumni
American computer scientists
City College of New York faculty
General Electric people
American computer programmers
Computer science writers
Fellows of the Association for Computing Machinery
Presidents of the Association for Computing Machinery
Deaths from cancer in New York (state)
Computer science educators